Dale Edwin Ho (born 1977) is an American lawyer who is the director of the American Civil Liberties Union's voting rights project. He is a nominee to be a United States district judge of the United States District Court for the Southern District of New York.

Early life and education
Ho was born in 1977 in San Jose, California. He received his A.B. summa cum laude from Princeton University in 1999 and his J.D. from Yale Law School in 2005.

Legal career
Ho served as a law clerk to Judge Barbara S. Jones of the United States District Court for the Southern District of New York (2005–2006) and Associate Judge Robert S. Smith of the New York Court of Appeals (2006–2007). Through the fellowship, he worked for the private law firm Fried, Frank, Harris, Shriver & Jacobson as a NAACP Legal Defense & Educational Fund, Inc. (NAACP LDF) Fellow (2007–2009), and then as a staff attorney with the NAACP LDF from 2009–2013, where he worked on legislative redistricting projects, including anti-gerrymandering efforts.

In 2013, Ho became director of the American Civil Liberties Union Voting Rights Project. Since 2014, Ho has taught a racial justice clinic as an adjunct professor at the New York University School of Law.

In 2019, Ho was one of five ACLU lawyers featured in the documentary The Fight, produced by actress Kerry Washington, which followed his preparation, oral argument, and reaction in the United States Supreme Court proceedings around Department of Commerce v. New York.

Notable cases 
In 2018, Ho was a lead attorney in Fish v. Kobach, in which the district appeals court ruled that it was illegal to require documentary proof of citizenship in order to register to vote. Ho argued the case before the U.S. Court of Appeals for the Tenth Circuit, which affirmed the Kansas district court's ruling.
Ho argued twice against the Trump administration in front of the U.S. Supreme Court. In Department of Commerce v. New York (2019), Ho represented a coalition of immigrant advocacy groups who successfully challenged Donald Trump's plan to include a citizenship question on the 2020 United States census questionnaire. 
In Trump v. New York (2020), the ACLU unsuccessfully challenged the Trump administration's plan to exclude undocumented immigrants from the congressional apportionment process.

Nomination to district court 

Since the start of President Joe Biden's administration, Ho has been considered a potential nominee for a federal judgeship. On June 7, 2021, Senate Majority Leader Chuck Schumer recommended Ho for a federal judgeship to the United States District Court for the Southern District of New York. On September 30, 2021,  Biden nominated Ho to serve as a judge of that court, to the seat vacated by Judge Katherine B. Forrest, who resigned on September 11, 2018.

On December 1, 2021, a hearing on his nomination was held before the Senate Judiciary Committee. During his confirmation hearing, Ho apologized for his "overheated rhetoric" on social media, which included past tweets critical of three Republican members of the Senate Judiciary Committee, Marsha Blackburn, Mike Lee, and Tom Cotton. He was questioned by senators over a tweet in which he appeared to refer to himself as a "wild-eyed sort of leftist"; he explained that he was "referring to a caricature of the way other people may have described me, not how I would describe myself." A resurfaced video from 2018 showed Ho calling the U.S. Senate and the Electoral College "undemocratic" and arguing that voting should be made easier and that people with criminal convictions should not lose the right to vote. The conservative Judicial Crisis Network launched a $300,000 television ad campaign against Ho (the group's first TV campaign against a Biden judicial nominee); in response, progressive group Demand Justice launched a six-figure ad campaign in support of Ho. On January 3, 2022, his nomination was returned to the President under Rule XXXI, Paragraph 6 of the United States Senate; he was renominated the same day. On January 20, 2022, his nomination was deadlocked by the Judiciary Committee by an 11–11 vote. On January 3, 2023, his nomination was returned to the President under Rule XXXI, Paragraph 6 of the Senate; he was renominated later the same day. On February 9, 2023, his nomination was reported out of committee by an 11–10 vote. His nomination is pending before the United States Senate.

Personal life
Ho is a member of the First Unitarian Congregational Society of Brooklyn.

See also 
 Joe Biden judicial appointment controversies

References

External links 
 Dale Ho's biography at the ACLU
 

1970s births
21st-century American lawyers
American Civil Liberties Union people
American civil rights lawyers
American jurists of Filipino descent
American people of Filipino descent
Living people
New York University School of Law faculty
Princeton University alumni
Suffrage
Yale Law School alumni